Miss India Earth was  declared in a private ceremony where Miss India Earth Air 2016 Shaan Suhas Kumar was declared as Miss India for Miss Earth 2017

Final results

Crossover
 Femina Miss India Bhopal 2016 (Finalist.) 
 India's Top Model 2016 (Winner )
Shaan Suhas Kumar

References

Miss Earth India